The men's freestyle 130 kilograms is a competition featured at the 1997 World Wrestling Championships, and was held at the Yenisey Sports Palace in Krasnoyarsk, Russia from 29 to 31 August 1997.

Results

Round 1

Round 2

Round 3

Round 4

Round 5

Round 6

Finals

References

External links
UWW Database

Men's freestyle 99 kg